Enis Çokaj (born 23 February 1999) is an Albanian professional footballer who plays as a midfielder for Greek Super League club Panathinaikos.

International career
Çokaj debuted for the Albania national team in a 5–0 2022 FIFA World Cup qualification win over San Marino on 8 September 2021.

References

External links

1999 births
Living people
Albanian footballers
Albania international footballers
Association football midfielders
Kategoria Superiore players
Croatian Football League players
Super League Greece players
KF Laçi players
NK Lokomotiva Zagreb players
Panathinaikos F.C. players
Albanian expatriate footballers
Expatriate footballers in Croatia
Expatriate footballers in Greece
Albanian expatriate sportspeople in Croatia
Albanian expatriate sportspeople in Greece
People from Malësi e Madhe